= Wandering Scribe =

British blogger

Wandering Scribe is a blogger who published under the name of Anya Peters, while a homeless woman.

She came to the attention of the public in April 2006, when her blog was featured in an article in the New York Times and by the BBC in their online magazine.

Anya Peters described herself as a law graduate, who had come to be homeless after a mental breakdown following a bad relationship and debts. She said she was living in her car in some woods in central London, and taking showers in a local hospital. She further explained that her personal pride and fear prevented her from accepting any form of assistance from the authorities, and that there were no friends or family to whom she could turn. The blog's author also mentioned that she had written an (unpublished) novel and that she harboured feelings of jealousy for another homeless blogger who had received some sort of book deal because attention was drawn to his plight. In one post, Wandering Scribe wondered whether any "blog trawling" literary agents might read her blog.

The blog is written in a stream-of-consciousness style, with many spelling and grammatical errors. Frequently, posts are very long. She makes occasional references to an unhappy childhood.

Wandering Scribe said she was rescued from her situation when a literary agent spotted her blog after it appeared as the subject of a magazine article by the BBC online and was impressed by her writing skills. The blog reports how she had been commissioned to write a full-length book but did not reveal the subject matter beyond saying that it concerned how she became homeless. The BBC published another article saying that the blogger had "written herself out" of her situation.

After this, Wandering Scribe made only a handful of new posts, in which she stated that she was no longer homeless, and a lengthy post in which she describes a visit to her father in Ireland, where she tells him about her upcoming autobiography.

The book was subsequently advertised on Amazon UK as being titled Abandoned and being an autobiography of Anya Peters.
